Bepannah ( Endless) is a Hindi language romantic mystery drama television series that aired from 19 March to 30 November 2018 on Colors TV. Produced by Cinevistaas Limited, it streamed on Voot and starred Harshad Chopda and Jennifer Winget.

Plot
Aditya Hooda and Zoya Siddiqui are two individuals brought together by fate through their spouses' betrayal.

Aditya and Zoya's partners Pooja Mathur and Yash Arora are found dead together in a road accident. They discover that the two were having an affair and are left shocked. Aditya channels his grief into anger while Zoya goes into denial. The divorce papers filed by Pooja and Yash reach them late. Unable to run from the truth anymore, Zoya attempts suicide but is saved by Aditya.

As the two bond over their shared trauma, CBI Inspector Rajveer Khanna enters their lives with a relentless hunger to put them behind bars. He believes them to be guilty for the murder of their spouses and frames for the same. Having grown to trust one another, Aditya and Zoya go on the run to prove their innocence.

Harshvardhan proves them innocent. Aditya and Zoya read Pooja's diary and break down, learning that Pooja was pregnant with Yash's child. Broken but resolute, Aditya and Zoya decide to move on. Together, they forgive Yash and Pooja. Aditya leaves for Paris, wanting time to reflect on himself, while Zoya focuses on reviving her bankrupt company.

Six months later
Zoya is a successful entrepreneur, while Aditya remains in Paris. Sakshi is being held hostage by Anjana. Zoya supports Noor and Arjun when she finds out about their feelings. When Aditya returns, he finds Zoya a more confident and assertive version of herself while he himself has grown quieter. Their friendship blooms as they begin spending time together. Aditya feels new emotions arising in his heart for Zoya. He ignores them at first but later accepts that he has fallen in love with her.

When Aditya decides to confess to Zoya, he gets to know about her suitor Arshad Habib. Aditya gets jealous on seeing Zoya spend time with him. Sakshi is aware about Anjana being Pooja and Yash's murderer and warns her of the fact. Afraid of getting exposed, Anjana pushes Sakshi off a cliff. Differences arise between Arjun and Noor. Aditya confesses his love to Zoya, but she misunderstands him.

Amidst the confusion, Zoya agrees to marry Arshad. Aditya confronts her and asks her to listen to her heart. Zoya remains obstinate but his words continue to linger in her mind. She tries faking a smile but realizes she is genuinely not happy. Zoya reminisces her moments with Aditya on her wedding day. She accepts her feelings for him, but Waseem breaks ties with her. Aditya proposes Zoya and the two get married, promising to always love, trust and stand by each other.

Zoya starts getting anonymous messages and calls threatening her from Kalpana Dadeech. She brings out the truth about Rajveer being Harshvardhan's son and reveals his past where her daughter Pallavi was pregnant with Rajveer but Harshvardhan, unaware of it, had married Anjana. Heartbroken and shattered, Pallavi had committed suicide. Rajveer and Kalpana kill Harshvardhan to avenge Pallavi's death and frame Aditya, who is found unconscious near Harshvardhan's body, holding the knife. Anjana goes in shock and Arjun leaves the house. Rajveer causes misunderstandings between Aditya and Zoya. The two, broken and helpless, go their separate ways.

One year later
Aditya has taken over Hooda and Associates. Anjana is mentally unstable and kept under supervision. Zoya having studied clinical psychology, gets an internship in the same hospital Anjana is admitted in. Aditya and Zoya miss each other and reminisce the love they shared. Noor bumps into Arjun in Delhi. They try to resist one another, but fail. Aditya and Zoya come face to face. They try to ignore their feelings and act cold towards each other.

Eventually, unable to control their emotions anymore, Aditya and Zoya reconcile. Arjun reaches Mussoorie and confesses his love for Noor. Anjana recalls everything and owns up about killing Pooja, Yash and Sakshi. She asks Aditya and Zoya to forgive her and is arrested. Aditya breaks down in disbelief. Zoya comforts him and the two embrace. Arjun and Noor get married and Aditya, Zoya, Arjun, Noor, Roshnaq and Waseem pose for a photograph.

Cast

Main
 Harshad Chopda as Captain Aditya "Adi" Hooda: Pilot and businessman; Owner of Zosh Events; Anjana and Harshvardhan's elder son; Arjun's brother; Rajveer's half-brother; Pooja's widower; Zoya's husband (2018)
 Jennifer Winget as Zoya Siddiqui Hooda: Event manager and businesswoman; Owner of Zosh Events; Roshnaq and Waseem's elder daughter; Noor's sister; Yash's widow; Aditya's wife (2018)

Recurring
 Rajesh Khattar as Harshvardhan "Harsh" Hooda: Renowned criminal lawyer; Anjana's husband; Aditya, Arjun and Rajveer's father (2018) (Dead)
 Parineeta Borthakur as Anjana Hooda: Harshvardhan's widow; Aditya and Arjun's mother (2018)
 Iqbal Azad as Waseem Siddiqui: Roshnaq's husband; Zoya and Noor's father (2018)
 Aaryaa Sharma as Roshnaq Siddiqui: Waseem's wife; Zoya and Noor's mother (2018)
 Shehzad Shaikh as Arjun Hooda: Lawyer and radio jockey; Anjana and Harshvardhan's younger son; Aditya's brother; Rajveer's half-brother; Noor's husband (2018)
 Aanchal Goswami as Noor Siddiqui Hooda: Roshnaq and Waseem's younger daughter; Zoya's sister; Arjun's wife (2018)
 Namita Dubey as Pooja Mathur: Poet and artist; Sakshi's daughter; Aditya's first wife; Yash's lover (2018) (Dead)
 Sehban Azim as Yash Arora: Businessman and poet; Former owner of Zosh events; Madhu's son; Mahi's brother; Zoya's first husband; Pooja's lover (2018) (Dead)
 Vaishnavi Dhanraj as Mahi Arora: Madhu's daughter; Yash's sister (2018) 
 Shweta Gautam as Madhu Arora: Yash and Mahi's mother (2018)
 Mallika Nayak as Sakshi Mathur: Pooja's mother (2018) (Dead)
 Apurva Agnihotri as Rajveer Khanna: CBI officer; Pallavi and Harshvardhan's son; Aditya and Arjun's half-brother (2018)
 Shagufta Ali as Kalpana Dadeech: Pallavi's mother; Rajveer's grandmother (2018)
 Unknown as Pallavi Dadeech: Kalpana's daughter; Harshvardhan's former lover; Rajveer's mother (2018)
 Taher Shabbir as Arshad Habib: Doctor; Ameena and Sohail's son; Zoya's suitor (2018)
 Anjali Thakkar as Ameena Habib: Sohail's wife; Arshad's mother (2018)
 Unknown as Sohail Habib: Ameena's husband; Arshad's father; Waseem's friend (2018)
 Ishani Sharma as Milli: Receptionist at Hooda and Associates; Aditya's assistant (2018)
 Hargun Grover as Kunal: Aditya's friend (2018)
 Farah Lakhani as Mona: Employee at Zosh (2018)
 Palak Jain as Akanksha: Employee at Zosh (2018)
 Arun Sharma as Mithilesh: Employee at Zosh (2018)
 Yash Bhatia as Shaun: Employee at Zosh (2018)
 Nitesh Prasher as Vinod: Employee at Zosh (2018)
 Chandar Khanna as Kanti Virani: Client at Zosh Events; patriarch of the Virani family; Kalpesh and Sumer's father (2018)
 Rushil Bangia as Kalpesh Virani: Client at Zosh Events; Kanti's son; Sumer's brother; Sagarika's husband; Rajveer's friend (2018)
 Manisha Marzara as Sagarika Virani: Client at Zosh Events; Kalpesh's wife (2018)
 Sidhant Kapoor as Sumer Virani: Client at Zosh Events; Kanti's son; Kalpesh's brother (2018)
 Urfi Javed as Bella Kapoor: Client at Zosh Events; Rohan's wife (2018)
 Aakash Mansukhani as Rohan: Client at Zosh Events; Bella's husband (2018)
 Amir Malik as Ashish: Yash's friend and former company partner (2018)
 Sanjeev Sharma as Court Judge (2018)

Guests

Production

Development
The show was earlier titled Adhura Alvida but was later renamed Bepannaah.

Casting
Harshad Chopda and Jennifer Winget were cast as Aditya Hooda and Zoya Siddiqui.

On being asked about how he selected his role, Chopda said, "I am returning to television after a hiatus and I was consciously waiting to pick the right story. Bepannaah's core concept was the major influence in this case; Jennifer and I hit off as soon as we met. I'm sure it will be exciting for the audience to see us together onscreen." Winget added, "The first time I heard the narration for the show, I had tears in my eyes; a show like Bepannaah comes your way rarely and I am ecstatic to be a part of it."

Apart from them; Rajesh Khattar, Parineeta Borthakur, Shehzad Shaikh, Aanchal Goswami, Iqbal Azad, Aaryaa Sharma, Namita Dubey, Sehban Azim and Vaishnavi Dhanraj were cast to portray Harshvardhan Hooda, Anjana Hooda, Arjun Hooda, Noor Siddiqui, Waseem Siddiqui, Roshnaq Siddiqui, Pooja Mathur, Yash Arora and Mahi Arora.

In May 2018, Apurva Agnihotri joined the cast as Rajveer Khanna. Taher Shabbir was chosen to play Dr. Arshad Habib.

Filming
Bepannaah was mainly shot in Cinevistaas Studios, Mumbai but the opening sequences were filmed in Mussoorie.

Soundtrack

Bepannah's soundtrack is written and composed by Rahul Jain. It released on 26 March 2018. The title track, Bepannaah, is sung by Rahul Jain and Roshni Shah. Zaroorat, sung by Rahul Jain and Ankita Dwivedi, was released on 18 August 2018.

Reception

Ratings
According to BARC India reports, Bepannaah debuted with 5.8 million impressions and a 2.7 TRP. Thus, making it to the list of top five shows in its very first week.

Reviews
The Times Of India said, "The show comes as a breath of fresh air and attempts at a new story filled with mystery and romance."

India Today noted, "Bepannaah is as intense as it could get: be it romance or murder mystery and as fresh as an Indian TV show can be in terms of packaging and treatment. Jennifer Winget and Harshad Chopda deliver a stupendous performance.”

Bollywood Life commented, "Bepannaah with its finesse is a welcome change. The story promises to be an enthralling one."

Awards and nominations

References

Colors TV original programming
2018 Indian television series debuts
Hindi-language television shows
Indian drama television series
Television shows set in Mumbai
Indian mystery television series
2018 Indian television series endings